Hope Island is a small tadpole shaped Island situated off the coast of Kakinada, India, in the Bay of Bengal.

Geography 

A relatively young island, it formed in the late 18th century, from the sediment outflow carried by the waters of the Koringa River, a distributary of the Godavari. The small bay it encloses is outflow basin of the Koringa, the northernmost distributary of the Godavari. The sand bars formed have gained permanence due to successive deposition of sand and alluvial silt due to meeting of the low salinity waters of the river meeting the saline waters of the Bay of Bengal.

Hope Island protects the city of Kakinada from the strong storm surges coming from the Bay of Bengal. Hope Island acts as natural barrier for storm surges and possible tsunami events and provides tranquility to the ships anchored in Kakinada Bay which makes Kakinada Port one of the safest natural ports in the eastern coast of India.

The northern tip of the island is called "Godavari Point", which overlooks the entry point into the Kakinada Bay and the Kakinada harbour.
Indian armed forces are using this island for beaching practice very often. Indian Navy landing craft War ships are conducting exercises for Marcos and special forces.

Marine habitat 
The sandy beaches of Hope island, along with the adjacent Coringa Wildlife Sanctuary are a nesting ground of the vulnerable olive ridley turtle, with 482 females laying eggs on the beaches of Hope Island in 2016. In recent years hundreds of dead turtles have also washed up on the beaches due to injuries from mechanized fishing boats operating off the Andhra coast. Conservationists, wildlife and forest officials have raised concern regarding the mechanized fishing, and conducted sensitization programs and retro-fitting with "turtle excluder devices" to prevent injuries to the endangered reptiles.

Population 
Hope Island houses two small hamlets of fisher folk, named Putrayya Pakalu and Sorlagondu Pakalu housing about 400 families. There are also a few government buildings. The Kakinada Port authorities have conducted dredging activities in the bay in an effort to keep port activities, which has aggravated the erosion loss of land on Hope Island. Erosion due to tidal and storm surges during the cyclone season are also issues as reported by the local fisher folk - who report that erosion has bifurcated the island into two with a 50-meter wide channel.

References 

Islands of Andhra Pradesh
Kakinada
Geography of East Godavari district
Islands of India
Populated places in India
Islands of the Bay of Bengal